A locomotive or engine is a rail transport vehicle that provides the motive power for a train. If a locomotive is capable of carrying a payload, it is usually rather referred to as a multiple unit, motor coach, railcar or power car; the use of these self-propelled vehicles is increasingly common for passenger trains, but rare for freight.

Traditionally, locomotives pulled trains from the front. However, push-pull operation has become common, where the train may have a locomotive (or locomotives) at the front, at the rear, or at each end. Most recently railroads have begun adopting DPU or distributed power. The front may have one or two locomotives followed by a mid-train locomotive that is controlled remotely from the lead unit. 


Etymology
The word locomotive originates from the Latin  'from a place', ablative of  'place', and the Medieval Latin  'causing motion', and is a shortened form of the term locomotive engine, which was first used in 1814 to distinguish between self-propelled and stationary steam engines.

Classifications

Prior to locomotives, the motive force for railways had been generated by various lower-technology methods such as human power, horse power, gravity or stationary engines that drove cable systems. Few such systems are still in existence today. Locomotives may generate their power from fuel (wood, coal, petroleum or natural gas), or they may take power from an outside source of electricity. It is common to classify locomotives by their source of energy. The common ones include:

Steam

A steam locomotive is a locomotive whose primary power source is a steam engine. The most common form of steam locomotive also contains a boiler to generate the steam used by the engine. The water in the boiler is heated by burning combustible material – usually coal, wood, or oil – to produce steam. The steam moves reciprocating pistons which are connected to the locomotive's main wheels, known as the "driving wheels". Both fuel and water supplies are carried with the locomotive, either on the locomotive itself, in bunkers and tanks, (this arrangement is known as a "tank locomotive") or pulled behind the locomotive, in tenders, (this arrangement is known as a "tender locomotive").

The first full-scale working railway steam locomotive was built by Richard Trevithick in 1802. It was constructed for the Coalbrookdale ironworks in Shropshire in England though no record of it working there has survived. On 21 February 1804, the first recorded steam-hauled railway journey took place as another of Trevithick's locomotives hauled a train from the Penydarren ironworks, in Merthyr Tydfil, to Abercynon in South Wales. Accompanied by Andrew Vivian, it ran with mixed success. The design incorporated a number of important innovations including the use of high-pressure steam which reduced the weight of the engine and increased its efficiency.

In 1812, Matthew Murray's twin-cylinder rack locomotive Salamanca first ran on the edge-railed rack-and-pinion Middleton Railway; this is generally regarded as the first commercially successful locomotive. Another well-known early locomotive was Puffing Billy, built 1813–14 by engineer William Hedley for the Wylam Colliery near Newcastle upon Tyne. This locomotive is the oldest preserved, and is on static display in the Science Museum, London. George Stephenson built Locomotion No. 1 for the Stockton & Darlington Railway in the north-east of England, which was the first public steam railway in the world. In 1829, his son Robert built The Rocket in Newcastle upon Tyne. Rocket was entered into, and won, the Rainhill Trials. This success led to the company emerging as the pre-eminent early builder of steam locomotives used on railways in the UK, US and much of Europe. The Liverpool & Manchester Railway, built by Stephenson, opened a year later making exclusive use of steam power for passenger and goods trains.

The steam locomotive remained by far the most common type of locomotive until after World War II. Steam locomotives are less efficient than modern diesel and electric locomotives, and a significantly larger workforce is required to operate and service them. British Rail figures showed that the cost of crewing and fuelling a steam locomotive was about two and a half times larger than the cost of supporting an equivalent diesel locomotive, and the daily mileage they could run was lower. Between about 1950 and 1970, the majority of steam locomotives were retired from commercial service and replaced with electric and diesel-electric locomotives. While North America transitioned from steam during the 1950s, and continental Europe by the 1970s, in other parts of the world, the transition happened later. Steam was a familiar technology that used widely-available fuels and in low-wage economies did not suffer as wide a cost disparity. It continued to be used in many countries until the end of the 20th century. By the end of the 20th century, almost the only steam power remaining in regular use around the world was on heritage railways.

Internal combustion 

Internal combustion locomotives use an internal combustion engine, connected to the driving wheels by a transmission. Typically they keep the engine running at a near-constant speed whether the locomotive is stationary or moving. Internal combustion locomotives are categorised by their fuel type and sub-categorised by their transmission type.

Benzene 
Benzene locomotives have an internal combustion engines that use benzene as fuel. Between the late 1890's and 1900's, a number of commercial manufacturers for Benzene Locomotives had been operating. This began with Deutz, that produced an operating system based upon a design prototype for a manganese mine in Giessen. Following, in the early 1900's, they had been sold for multiple mining and Tunnelling operations. Post the 1900's, no wide spread use was necessary or required, their inadequacy had increased with the existence of petrol and diesel locomotives.

Kerosene

Kerosene locomotives use kerosene as the fuel. They were the world's first internal combustion locomotives, preceding diesel and other oil locomotives by some years. The first known kerosene rail vehicle was a draisine built by Gottlieb Daimler in 1887, but this was not technically a locomotive as it carried a payload.

A kerosene locomotive was built in 1894 by the Priestman Brothers of Kingston upon Hull for use on Hull docks. This locomotive was built using a 12 hp double-acting marine type engine, running at 300 rpm, mounted on a 4-wheel wagon chassis. It was only able to haul one loaded wagon at a time, due to its low power output, and was not a great success. The first successful kerosene locomotive was "Lachesis" built by Richard Hornsby & Sons and delivered to Woolwich Arsenal railway in 1896. The company built four kerosene locomotives between 1896 and 1903, for use at the Arsenal.

Petrol

Petrol locomotives use petrol (gasoline) as their fuel. The first commercially successful petrol locomotive was a petrol-mechanical locomotive built by the Maudslay Motor Company in 1902, for the Deptford Cattle Market in London. It was an 80 hp locomotive using a 3-cylinder vertical petrol engine, with a two speed mechanical gearbox.

Petrol-mechanical

The most common type of petrol locomotive are petrol-mechanical locomotives, which use mechanical transmission in the form of gearboxes (sometimes in conjunction with chain drives) to deliver the power output of the engine to the driving wheels, in the same way as a car. The second petrol-mechanical locomotive was built by F.C. Blake of Kew in January 1903 for the Richmond Main Sewerage Board.

Petrol-electric

Petrol-electric locomotives are petrol locomotives which use electric transmission to deliver the power output of the engine to the driving wheels. This avoids the need for gearboxes by converting the rotary mechanical force of the engine into electrical energy by a dynamo, and then powering the wheels by multi-speed electric traction motors. This allows for smoother acceleration, as it avoids the need for gear changes, however, it is more expensive, heavier, and sometimes bulkier than mechanical transmission.

A notable early petrol-electric locomotive was built in 1913 for the Minneapolis, St. Paul, Rochester and Dubuque Electric Traction Company. It weighed 60 tons, generated 350 hp and drove through a pair of bogies in a Bo-Bo arrangement.

Diesel 

Diesel locomotives are powered by diesel engines. In the early days of diesel propulsion development, various transmission systems were employed with varying degrees of success, with electric transmission proving to be the most popular.

Diesel-mechanical

A diesel–mechanical locomotive uses mechanical transmission to transfer power to the wheels. This type of transmission is generally limited to low-powered, low speed shunting (switching) locomotives, lightweight multiple units and self-propelled railcars. The earliest diesel locomotives were diesel-mechanical. In 1906, Rudolf Diesel, Adolf Klose and the steam and diesel engine manufacturer Gebrüder Sulzer founded Diesel-Sulzer-Klose GmbH to manufacture diesel-powered locomotives. The Prussian State Railways ordered a diesel locomotive from the company in 1909. The world's first diesel-powered locomotive (a diesel-mechanical locomotive) was operated in the summer of 1912 on the Winterthur–Romanshorn railway in Switzerland, but was not a commercial success. Small numbers of prototype diesel locomotives were produced in a number of countries through the mid-1920s.

Diesel-electric

Diesel–electric locomotives are diesel locomotives using electric transmission. The diesel engine drives either an electrical DC generator (generally, less than  net for traction), or an electrical AC alternator-rectifier (generally  net or more for traction), the output of which provides power to the traction motors that drive the locomotive. There is no mechanical connection between the diesel engine and the wheels. The vast majority of diesel locomotives today are diesel-electric.

In 1914, Hermann Lemp, a General Electric electrical engineer, developed and patented a reliable direct current electrical control system (subsequent improvements were also patented by Lemp).  Lemp's design used a single lever to control both engine and generator in a coordinated fashion, and was the prototype for all diesel–electric locomotive control. In 1917–18, GE produced three experimental diesel–electric locomotives using Lemp's control design. In 1924, a diesel-electric locomotive (Eel2 original number Юэ 001/Yu-e 001) started operations. It had been designed by a team led by Yury Lomonosov and built 1923–1924 by Maschinenfabrik Esslingen in Germany. It had 5 driving axles (1'E1'). After several test rides, it hauled trains for almost three decades from 1925 to 1954.

Diesel-hydraulic

Diesel–hydraulic locomotives are diesel locomotives using hydraulic transmission. In this arrangement, they use one or more torque converters, in combination with gears, with a mechanical final drive to convey the power from the diesel engine to the wheels.

The main worldwide user of main-line hydraulic transmissions was the Federal Republic of Germany, with designs including the 1950s DB Class V 200, and the 1960 and 1970s DB V 160 family. British Rail introduced a number of diesel hydraulic designs during it 1955 Modernisation Plan, initially license built versions of German designs. In Spain Renfe used high power to weight ratio twin engined German designs to haul high speed trains from the 1960s to 1990s. (see Renfe Classes 340, 350, 352, 353, 354).

Hydrostatic drive systems have also been applied to rail use, for example  shunting locomotives by CMI Group (Belgium). Hydrostatic drives are also used in railway maintenance machines such as tampers and rail grinders.

Gas turbine

A gas turbine locomotive is an internal combustion engine locomotive consisting of a gas turbine. ICE engines require a transmission to power the wheels. The engine must be allowed to continue to run when the locomotive is stopped.

Gas turbine-mechanical locomotives use a mechanical transmission to deliver the power output of gas turbines to the wheels. A gas turbine locomotive was patented in 1861 by Marc Antoine Francois Mennons (British patent no. 1633). There is no evidence that the locomotive was actually built but the design includes the essential features of gas turbine locomotives, including compressor, combustion chamber, turbine and air pre-heater. In 1952, Renault delivered a prototype four-axle 1150 hp gas-turbine-mechanical locomotive fitted with the Pescara "free turbine" gas- and compressed-air producing system, rather than a co-axial multi-stage compressor integral to the turbine. This model was succeeded by a pair of six-axle 2400 hp locomotives with two turbines and Pescara feeds in 1959. Several similar locomotives were built in USSR by Kharkov Locomotive Works.

Gas turbine-electric locomotives, use a gas turbine to drive an electrical generator or alternator which produced electric current powers the traction motor which drive the wheels. It was completed in 1941, and then underwent testing before entering regular service. The Am 4/6 was the first gas turbine – electric locomotive. British Rail 18000 was built by Brown Boveri and delivered in 1949. British Rail 18100 was built by Metropolitan-Vickers and delivered in 1951. A third locomotive, the British Rail GT3, was constructed in 1961. Union Pacific ran a large fleet of turbine-powered freight locomotives starting in the 1950s. These were widely used on long-haul routes, and were cost-effective despite their poor fuel economy due to their use of "leftover" fuels from the petroleum industry. At their height the railroad estimated that they powered about 10% of Union Pacific's freight trains, a much wider use than any other example of this class.

A gas turbine offers some advantages over a piston engine. There are few moving parts, decreasing the need for lubrication and potentially reducing maintenance costs, and the power-to-weight ratio is much higher. A turbine of a given power output is also physically smaller than an equally powerful piston engine, allowing a locomotive to be very powerful without being inordinately large. However, a turbine's power output and efficiency both drop dramatically with rotational speed, unlike a piston engine, which has a comparatively flat power curve. This makes GTEL systems useful primarily for long-distance high-speed runs. Additional problems with gas turbine-electric locomotives included that they were very noisy.

Electric

An electric locomotive is a locomotive powered only by electricity. Electricity is supplied to moving trains with a (nearly) continuous conductor running along the track that usually takes one of three forms: an overhead line, suspended from poles or towers along the track or from structure or tunnel ceilings; a third rail mounted at track level; or an onboard battery. Both overhead wire and third-rail systems usually use the running rails as the return conductor but some systems use a separate fourth rail for this purpose. The type of electrical power used is either direct current (DC) or alternating current (AC).

Various collection methods exist: a trolley pole, which is a long flexible pole that engages the line with a wheel or shoe; a bow collector, which is a frame that holds a long collecting rod against the wire; a pantograph, which is a hinged frame that holds the collecting shoes against the wire in a fixed geometry; or a contact shoe, which is a shoe in contact with the third rail. Of the three, the pantograph method is best suited for high-speed operation.

Electric locomotives almost universally use axle-hung traction motors, with one motor for each powered axle. In this arrangement, one side of the motor housing is supported by plain bearings riding on a ground and polished journal that is integral to the axle. The other side of the housing has a tongue-shaped protuberance that engages a matching slot in the truck (bogie) bolster, its purpose being to act as a torque reaction device, as well as a support. Power transfer from motor to axle is effected by spur gearing, in which a pinion on the motor shaft engages a bull gear on the axle. Both gears are enclosed in a liquid-tight housing containing lubricating oil. The type of service in which the locomotive is used dictates the gear ratio employed. Numerically high ratios are commonly found on freight units, whereas numerically low ratios are typical of passenger engines.

Electricity is typically generated in large and relatively efficient generating stations, transmitted to the railway network and distributed to the trains. Some electric railways have their own dedicated generating stations and transmission lines but most purchase power from an electric utility. The railway usually provides its own distribution lines, switches and transformers.

Electric locomotives usually cost 20% less than diesel locomotives, their maintenance costs are 25–35% lower, and cost up to 50% less to run.

Direct current

The earliest systems were DC systems. The first electric passenger train was presented by Werner von Siemens at Berlin in 1879. The locomotive was driven by a 2.2 kW, series-wound motor, and the train, consisting of the locomotive and three cars, reached a speed of 13 km/h. During four months, the train carried 90,000 passengers on a 300-metre-long (984 feet) circular track. The electricity (150 V DC) was supplied through a third insulated rail between the tracks. A contact roller was used to collect the electricity. The world's first electric tram line opened in Lichterfelde near Berlin, Germany, in 1881. It was built by Werner von Siemens (see Gross-Lichterfelde Tramway and Berlin Straßenbahn). The Volk's Electric Railway opened in 1883 in Brighton, and is the oldest surviving electric railway. Also in 1883, Mödling and Hinterbrühl Tram opened near Vienna in Austria. It was the first in the world in regular service powered from an overhead line. Five years later, in the U.S. electric trolleys were pioneered in 1888 on the Richmond Union Passenger Railway, using equipment designed by Frank J. Sprague.

The first electrically worked underground line was the City & South London Railway, prompted by a clause in its enabling act prohibiting use of steam power. It opened in 1890, using electric locomotives built by Mather & Platt. Electricity quickly became the power supply of choice for subways, abetted by the Sprague's invention of multiple-unit train control in 1897.

The first use of electrification on a main line was on a four-mile stretch of the Baltimore Belt Line of the Baltimore & Ohio (B&O) in 1895 connecting the main portion of the B&O to the new line to New York through a series of tunnels around the edges of Baltimore's downtown. Three Bo+Bo units were initially used, at the south end of the electrified section; they coupled onto the locomotive and train and pulled it through the tunnels.

DC was used on earlier systems. These systems were gradually replaced by AC. Today, almost all main-line railways use AC systems. DC systems are confined mostly to urban transit such as metro systems, light rail and trams, where power requirement is less.

Alternating current

The first practical AC electric locomotive was designed by Charles Brown, then working for Oerlikon, Zürich. In 1891, Brown had demonstrated long-distance power transmission, using three-phase AC, between a hydro-electric plant at Lauffen am Neckar and Frankfurt am Main West, a distance of 280 km. Using experience he had gained while working for Jean Heilmann on steam-electric locomotive designs, Brown observed that three-phase motors had a higher power-to-weight ratio than DC motors and, because of the absence of a commutator, were simpler to manufacture and maintain. However, they were much larger than the DC motors of the time and could not be mounted in underfloor bogies: they could only be carried within locomotive bodies.

In 1894, Hungarian engineer Kálmán Kandó developed a new type 3-phase asynchronous electric drive motors and generators for electric locomotives. 
Kandó's early 1894 designs were first applied in a short three-phase AC tramway in Evian-les-Bains (France), which was constructed between 1896 and 1898. In 1918, Kandó invented and developed the rotary phase converter, enabling electric locomotives to use three-phase motors whilst supplied via a single overhead wire, carrying the simple industrial frequency (50 Hz) single phase AC of the high voltage national networks.

In 1896, Oerlikon installed the first commercial example of the system on the Lugano Tramway. Each 30-tonne locomotive had two  motors run by three-phase 750 V 40 Hz fed from double overhead lines. Three-phase motors run at constant speed and provide regenerative braking, and are well suited to steeply graded routes, and the first main-line three-phase locomotives were supplied by Brown (by then in partnership with Walter Boveri) in 1899 on the 40 km Burgdorf—Thun line, Switzerland. The first implementation of industrial frequency single-phase AC supply for locomotives came from Oerlikon in 1901, using the designs of Hans Behn-Eschenburg and Emil Huber-Stockar; installation on the Seebach-Wettingen line of the Swiss Federal Railways was completed in 1904. The 15 kV, 50 Hz , 48 tonne locomotives used transformers and rotary converters to power DC traction motors.

Italian railways were the first in the world to introduce electric traction for the entire length of a main line rather than just a short stretch. The 106 km Valtellina line was opened on 4 September 1902, designed by Kandó and a team from the Ganz works. The electrical system was three-phase at 3 kV 15 Hz. The voltage was significantly higher than used earlier and it required new designs for electric motors and switching devices. The three-phase two-wire system was used on several railways in Northern Italy and became known as "the Italian system". Kandó was invited in 1905 to undertake the management of Società Italiana Westinghouse and led the development of several Italian electric locomotives.

Battery-electric

A battery-electric locomotive (or battery locomotive) is an electric locomotive powered by on-board batteries; a kind of battery electric vehicle.

Such locomotives are used where a conventional diesel or electric locomotive would be unsuitable. An example is maintenance trains on electrified lines when the electricity supply is turned off. Another use is in industrial facilities where a combustion-powered locomotive (i.e., steam- or diesel-powered) could cause a safety issue due to the risks of fire, explosion or fumes in a confined space. Battery locomotives are preferred for mines where gas could be ignited by trolley-powered units arcing at the collection shoes, or where electrical resistance could develop in the supply or return circuits, especially at rail joints, and allow dangerous current leakage into the ground.

The first known electric locomotive was built in 1837 by chemist Robert Davidson of Aberdeen, and it was powered by galvanic cells (batteries). Davidson later built a larger locomotive named Galvani, exhibited at the Royal Scottish Society of Arts Exhibition in 1841. The seven-ton vehicle had two direct-drive reluctance motors, with fixed electromagnets acting on iron bars attached to a wooden cylinder on each axle, and simple commutators. It was tested on the Edinburgh and Glasgow Railway in September of the following year, but the limited power from batteries prevented its general use.

Another example was at the Kennecott Copper Mine, Latouche, Alaska, where in 1917 the underground haulage ways were widened to enable working by two battery locomotives of  tons. In 1928, Kennecott Copper ordered four 700-series electric locomotives with on-board batteries. These locomotives weighed 85 tons and operated on 750-volt overhead trolley wire with considerable further range whilst running on batteries. The locomotives provided several decades of service using Nickel–iron battery (Edison) technology. The batteries were replaced with lead-acid batteries, and the locomotives were retired shortly afterward. All four locomotives were donated to museums, but one was scrapped. The others can be seen at the Boone and Scenic Valley Railroad, Iowa, and at the Western Railway Museum in Rio Vista, California. The Toronto Transit Commission previously operated a battery electric locomotive built by Nippon Sharyo in 1968 and retired in 2009.

London Underground regularly operates battery-electric locomotives for general maintenance work.

Other types

Fireless

Atomic-electric
In the early 1950s, Dr. Lyle Borst of the University of Utah was given funding by various US railroad line and manufacturers to study the feasibility of an electric-drive locomotive, in which an onboard atomic reactor produced the steam to generate the electricity. At that time, atomic power was not fully understood; Borst believed the major stumbling block was the price of uranium. With the Borst atomic locomotive, the center section would have a 200-ton reactor chamber and steel walls 5 feet thick to prevent releases of radioactivity in case of accidents. He estimated a cost to manufacture atomic locomotives with 7000 h.p. engines at approximately $1,200,000 each. Consequently, trains with onboard nuclear generators were generally deemed unfeasible due to prohibitive costs.

Fuel cell-electric

In 2002, the first 3.6 tonne, 17 kW hydrogen (fuel cell) -powered mining locomotive was demonstrated in Val-d'Or, Quebec. In 2007 the educational mini-hydrail in Kaohsiung, Taiwan went into service. The Railpower GG20B finally is another example of a fuel cell-electric locomotive.

Hybrid locomotives

There are many different types of hybrid or dual-mode locomotives using two or more types of motive power. The most common hybrids are electro-diesel locomotives powered either from an electricity supply or else by an onboard diesel engine. These are used to provide continuous journeys along routes that are only partly electrified. Examples include the EMD FL9 and Bombardier ALP-45DP

Use
There are three main uses of locomotives in rail transport operations: for hauling passenger trains, freight trains, and for switching (UK English: shunting).

Freight locomotives are normally designed to deliver high starting tractive effort and high sustained power. This allows them to start and move long, heavy trains, but usually comes at the cost of relatively low maximum speeds. Passenger locomotives usually develop lower starting tractive effort but are able to operate at the high speeds required to maintain passenger schedules. Mixed-traffic locomotives (US English: general purpose or road switcher locomotives) meant for both passenger and freight trains do not develop as much starting tractive effort as a freight locomotive but are able to haul heavier trains than a passenger locomotive.

Most steam locomotives have reciprocating engines, with pistons coupled to the driving wheels by means of connecting rods, with no intervening gearbox. This means the combination of starting tractive effort and maximum speed is greatly influenced by the diameter of the driving wheels. Steam locomotives intended for freight service generally have smaller diameter driving wheels than passenger locomotives.

In diesel-electric and electric locomotives the control system between the traction motors and axles adapts the power output to the rails for freight or passenger service.  Passenger locomotives may include other features, such as head-end power (also referred to as hotel power or electric train supply) or a steam generator.

Some locomotives are designed specifically to work steep grade railways, and feature extensive additional braking mechanisms and sometimes rack and pinion. Steam locomotives built for steep rack and pinion railways frequently have the boiler tilted relative to the locomotive frame, so that the boiler remains roughly level on steep grades.

Locomotives are also used on some High-speed trains: All TGV, many AVE, some Korea Train Express and the ICE 1 and ICE 2 trains all use locomotives, which may also be known as power cars. On the other hand, many high-speed trains such as the Shinkansen network never use locomotives. Instead of locomotives, they use electric multiple units (EMUs) -- passenger cars that also have traction motors. Using power cars allows for a high ride quality and less electrical equipment;
but EMUs have less axle weight, which reduces maintenance costs, and EMUs also have higher acceleration and higher seating capacity.
The KTX-Sancheon and ICE 3/4/T use a mixture of electric multiple units and power cars.

Operational role 

Locomotives occasionally work in a specific role, such as:
 Train engine is the technical name for a locomotive attached to the front of a railway train to haul that train. Alternatively, where facilities exist for push-pull operation, the train engine might be attached to the rear of the train;
 Pilot engine – a locomotive attached in front of the train engine, to enable double-heading;
 Banking engine – a locomotive temporarily assisting a train from the rear, due to a difficult start or a sharp incline gradient;
 Light engine – a locomotive operating without a train behind it, for relocation or operational reasons. Occasionally, a light engine is referred to as a train in and of itself.
 Station pilot – a locomotive used to shunt passenger trains at a railway station.

Wheel arrangement

The wheel arrangement of a locomotive describes how many wheels it has; common methods include the AAR wheel arrangement, UIC classification, and Whyte notation systems.

Remote control locomotives

In the second half of the twentieth century remote control locomotives started to enter service in switching operations, being remotely controlled by an operator outside of the locomotive cab.
The main benefit is one operator can control the loading of grain, coal, gravel, etc. into the cars. In addition, the same operator can move the train as needed. Thus, the locomotive is loaded or unloaded in about a third of the time.

See also

Notes

References

Bibliography

External links

 An engineer's guide from 1891
 Locomotive cutaways and historical locomotives of several countries ordered by dates
 Pickzone Locomotive Model
 International Steam Locomotives
 Turning a Locomotive into a Stationary Engine, Popular Science monthly, February 1919, page 72, Scanned by Google Books: Popular Science

 
19th-century inventions